Mordellistena yangi is a species of beetle in the genus Mordellistena of the family Mordellidae. It was described by Fan in 1995.

References

External links
Coleoptera. BugGuide.

Beetles described in 1995
yangi